Palmer Field is a multi-use baseball, soccer, and football stadium located in Middletown, Connecticut.

In 1993 and 1994, the first two editions of the Ivy League Baseball Championship Series were held at the field, with Yale claiming both titles.

External links
 Pictures of the field

References

New England Collegiate Baseball League ballparks
Baseball venues in Connecticut
American football venues in Connecticut
Soccer venues in Connecticut
Sports venues in Middlesex County, Connecticut
Middletown, Connecticut